Laura Sumner may refer to:
 Laura Sumner (numismatist), American classical numismatist and poet
 Laura Avery Sumner, a character from the soap opera Knots Landing